Geewa is a Czech mobile game developer based in Prague. Founded in 2005, the company develops and publishes casual, competitive, multiplayer games for mobile devices. Geewa was awarded the Red Herring 100 Europe award in 2013 and is best known for their games Smashing Four and Pool Live Tour. In 2017, Geewa lost CZK 18 mil ($813,461.04 USD) on sales of CZK 26 mil ($1,174,999.28 USD). The accumulated loss increased to CZK 174 mil ($7,863,456.72 USD).

History

Geewa is an acronym for Games for Everyone, Everywhere, With Anyone. Shortly after forming, the company launched the games portal "Geewa.com" with six initial games. Originally, their business model was based on free-to-play principles and financed through advertisement. 

In 2006, Geewa formed a partnership with Seznam.cz, the biggest web portal in the Czech Republic, to jointly operate a gaming portal called Hry.cz. Geewa raised $2.2 million in venture capital funding from Poland’s MCI Ventures in 2007. In the following two years, Geewa agreed to license partnerships with Bigpoint, Alawar and Ganymede for the distribution of their games on Geewa portals in the Czech Republic. A full microtransaction economy to enable sales of virtual goods was also implemented during this time.

In 2009, Geewa started to publish its games on Facebook, launching Pool Live Tour on the platform in 2010. The title was one of the most popular pool games on Facebook and hit 90+ million players at its peak.

In 2012, Geewa published Pirates Poker on Facebook.  

In 2013, Geewa released Pool Live Tour on mobile devices and the competitive word-forming game, On Words for browsers.

In 2014, Geewa raised $4.2 million in venture capital funding from investors including  Ventures and MCI Ventures. Geewa then released On Words and Munchie Mania on mobile devices. 2014 also marked the release of Tile On, a competitive tile-based puzzle game. Work also began on the successor to Pool Live Tour, with a focus on developing for the mobile market.

In 2015, Geewa launched their first sequel Pool Live Tour 2. They also released Prima Kvizy, a joint venture between Geewa and Czech TV company, Prima.

In 2016, Geewa released Pool Live Tour: Champions, and began work on a brand-new mobile game utilizing the pool physics from their Pool Live Tour series.

In 2018, Geewa launched Smashing Four globally. This fast paced PvP multiplayer mobile game, based on pool physics with upgradeable heroes, reached the no.1 game in Czech Apple App Store paid apps & no.1 in the Czech Google Play App Store paid app chart later that year. The game also reached the Top 250 grossing in the US iTunes charts. By the end of the year, Geewa revealed that Smashing Four had 3.5 million unique players in 2018.

In 2020, Geewa was acquired by US company AppLovin.

Games

External links
Official Geewa Website

References

Video game development companies
Video game companies of the Czech Republic
Companies established in 2005
Companies based in Prague
Companies based in Berlin
Virtual economies
Social networking mobile apps